Viktor Wallin (born January 17, 1980) is a Swedish former ice hockey defenceman.

Wallin was drafted 112th overall by the Mighty Ducks of Anaheim in the 1998 NHL Entry Draft. He played in Elitserien for HV71 and Timrå IK and the HockeyAllsvenskan for AIK IF and Nybro Vikings.

In 2005, Wallin joined Grenoble-based team Brûleurs de Loups in the Ligue Magnus in France and remained with the team for six seasons. In 2011, Wallin signed for Italian Serie B team HC Merano.

References

External links

1980 births
AIK IF players
Anaheim Ducks draft picks
Brûleurs de Loups players
HC Merano players
HV71 players
Living people
Nybro Vikings players
Swedish ice hockey defencemen
Timrå IK players
Lost in Space